The Sex Nest is a 1970 West German sex comedy directed by Alfred Vohrer. The film is about a brothel for neglected wives that is predominantly staffed by men.

Plot summary
The so-called yellow house Pinnasberg is a Hamburg brothel for women, which is, led by authoritarian "General" Werner Zibell, supported by its busy night porter. When one of his guys dies, he is replaced by the sociology student Stefan Bornemann which intends to do practical studies here.

Here, Stefan falls in love with Luise Zibell, the daughter of the brothel owner. Meanwhile, anger is finally appeased by his wife Clarissa. She persuade him to accept Stefan as a son and set the yellow house for sale. This is done just in time, because the work on a subway tunnels lead shortly after to the collapse of the house

Release
The Sex Nest was released in West Germany on February 27, 1970.  The film also had the alternative German title Eine Wohltat fur alle Frauen: Das gelbe Haus am Pinnasberg.

Reception
In a contemporary review, the Monthly Film Bulletin noted the acting and direction in the film were "of a much higher standard than in most German sex fare" but noted that the film's humour was still "terribly heavy-handed and the film's two 'serious' sub-plots...are never successfully integrated into the comic narrative."

See also
 List of German films of the 1970s

Notes

External links
 

1970s sex comedy films
West German films
Films directed by Alfred Vohrer
German sex comedy films
1970s German-language films
Films set in Hamburg
Films based on German novels
1970 comedy films
1970 films
1970s German films